Doss is a German surname. Notable people with the surname include:

Alan Doss (born 1945), British United Nations official and foundation president
Alan Doss [see: Galactic Cowboys] (born ?), American drummer, keyboardist, bass guitarist, manager, and producer
Barrett Doss (born 1989), American actor and singer
Barry Doss (born ?), American politician
Bill Doss (1968–2012), American musician and record company founder
Conya Doss (born 1972), American singer, songwriter, and multi-instrumentalist
Debi Doss (born ?), American-born British photographer and singer
Desmond Doss (1919–2006), American army corporal and combat medic; only conscientious objector to ever receive the US Medal of Honor
Doyle Doss (born ?), American inventor
D. S. Ravindra Doss (1945–2012), Indian journalist, newspaper editor, and union president
Edwin A. Doss (1914–1996), American fighter pilot and air force commander
Erika Doss (fl. 1980s–2020s), professor of American Studies at the University of Notre Dame
E. W. Doss (1869–1871), American politician
Hansjürgen Doss (born 1936), German politician
James Doss (1939–2012), American mystery novelist and Los Alamos National Laboratory electrical engineer
Jesu Pudumai Doss (born 1967), Indian Roman Catholic priest, professor, and author
Joe Morris Doss (born 1943), American Episcopal bishop, lawyer, author, and playwright
Keelan Doss (born 1996), American football player
K. S. R. Doss (1936–2012), Indian film director and editor 
Kurt Doss (born 1996), American actor
LaRoy Doss (1936–2004), American basketball player and car dealership owner
Lorenzo Doss (born 1994), American football player
Mark S. Doss (born 1957), American operatic bass-baritone vocalist
Mike Doss (born 1981), American football player, foundation founder, and medical salesman
Nannie Doss (1905–1965), American serial murderer
Nate Doss (born 1985), American disc golfer
Noble Doss (1920–2009), American football player
Reggie Doss (born 1956), American football player
Tandon Doss (born 1989), American football player
Terri Lynn Doss (born 1965), American model and actress

German-language surnames